The Very Best of 1989–1998 is a compilation album by the Greek artist Eleftheria Arvanitaki that was released in 1999 by Verve Records under the EmArcy label in several markets around the world. It is a compilation of 14 of Eleftheria's best songs.

Track listing 
"Dinata"
"To Kokkino Foustani"
"Meno Ektos"
"Skies Kai Hromata"
"Pame Ksana Sta Thavmata"
"Tou Pothou T' Agrimi"
"Ta Kormia Ke Ta Maheria"
"Fissa Psichi Mou"
"Kathreftizo To Nou"
"Lianotragoudo"
"Kima To Kima"
"Parapono / I Ksenitia"
"To Parapono"
"Tis Kalinihtas Ta Filia"

Eleftheria Arvanitaki compilation albums
Greek-language albums
1999 compilation albums
EmArcy Records compilation albums